The Mantiqueira Atlantic tree-rat (Phyllomys mantiqueirensis) is a spiny rat species found in Brazil.

References

Phyllomys
Mammals described in 2003